Charalá is a town and municipality in the south of the department of Santander in northeastern Colombia. Its antipode is located within the capital of Indonesia, Jakarta.

The municipality borders the municipalities Encino and Coromoro in the east, Oiba, Confines and Suaita in the west, Páramo, Ocamonte and Mogotes in the north and in the south Gámbita and Duitama, the latter in the department of Boyacá.

Climate

Etymology 
The name Charalá is Chibcha, the language of the Muisca and was given to honour the Guane cacique of the village; "Chalala".

History 
Before the arrival of the Spanish in the area, the Santander department was inhabited by the Guane. Charalá was located at the border of Guane territory and the Muisca Confederation of which it formed an independent unity.

Modern Charalá was founded by one of the conquistadors who was part in the Spanish conquest of the Muisca; Martín Galeano, on July 23, 1540.

Economy 
Main economical activities in the municipality are agriculture (coffee, sugar cane and maize) and marble mining.

Born in Charalá 
 José Acevedo y Gómez, independence hero of Colombia
 José Antonio Galán, was a Neogranadine historical. He was the leader of the Comuneros insurrection in 1781.

Trivia 
 Charalá is the type locality for the Santander poison frog (Andinobates virolinensis)

Gallery

References 

Municipalities of Santander Department
Populated places established in 1540
1540 establishments in the Spanish Empire
Muisca Confederation